La fanciulla del West (The Girl of the West) is an opera in three acts by Giacomo Puccini to an Italian libretto by  and , based on the 1905 play The Girl of the Golden West by the American author David Belasco. Fanciulla followed Madama Butterfly, which was also based on a Belasco play. The opera has fewer of the show-stopping highlights that characterize Puccini's other works, but is admired for its impressive orchestration and for a score that is more melodically integrated than is typical of his previous work. Fanciulla displays influences from composers Claude Debussy and Richard Strauss, without being in any way imitative. Similarities between the libretto and the work of Richard Wagner have also been found, though some attribute this more to the original plot of the play, and have asserted that the opera remains quintessentially Italian.

The opera had a successful and highly publicised premiere at the Metropolitan Opera, New York City, in 1910. Nevertheless, while Puccini deemed it one of his greatest works, La fanciulla del West has become a less popular opera within the composer's repertoire, drawing a mixed public reception overall. Despite the plot being a source of significant criticism, the majority of academics and musicians agree in calling it a magnum opus, particularly lauding its craftmanship. The conductor of the work's premiere, Arturo Toscanini, called the opera a "great symphonic poem".

Performance history

La fanciulla del West was commissioned by, and first performed at, the Metropolitan Opera in New York on 10 December 1910 with Met stars Enrico Caruso and Emmy Destinn for whom Puccini created the leading roles of Dick Johnson and Minnie. However, after Puccini saw Gilda dalla Rizza as Minnie at the Opéra de Monte-Carlo in 1921, he remarked, "At last I have seen my true Fanciulla." Also in the cast was Pasquale Amato as Jack Rance. The Met's music director Arturo Toscanini conducted. This was the first world premiere of an opera at the Met, and it was initially well received in the United States. However, it was never quite as popular in Europe, except perhaps in Germany. There it enjoyed a triumphant premiere at the Deutsches Opernhaus in Berlin (now known as the Deutsche Oper) in March 1913, under the musical direction of Ignatz Waghalter.

Other premieres took place in London on 29 May 1911 at Covent Garden Theatre; in Rome on 12 June 1911 at the Teatro Costanzi; at the Teatro Colón, Buenos Aires on 25 July 1911; and in Melbourne on 11 June 1912 at Her Majesty's Theatre. Recently, in South Korea, it premiered at the Seoul Arts Center on July 1, 2021.

On April 11, 1966, a performance of La Fanciulla del West was the very first given at the new  Metropolitan Opera House at Lincoln Center. 

Today, the opera is presented from time to time, but is not performed nearly as often as Puccini's other mature operas. The Metropolitan Opera presented the work in its 2010/11 season to mark the 100th anniversary of the opera's premiere in 1910.

Roles

Synopsis
Time:1849 to 1850.
Place: A mining camp at the foot of the Cloudy Mountains, California.

Act 1
Inside the Polka Saloon

A group of Gold Rush miners enter the "Polka" saloon after a day working at the mine ("Hello! Hello! Alla 'Polka'"). After a song by traveling minstrel Jake Wallace ("Che faranno i vecchi miei"), one of the miners, Jim Larkens, is homesick and the miners collect enough money for his fare home ("Jim, perché piangi?").

A group of miners playing cards discover that Sid is cheating and want to attack him. Sheriff Jack Rance quiets the fight and pins two cards to Sid's jacket, as a sign of a cheat.

A Wells Fargo agent, Ashby, enters and announces that he is chasing the bandit Ramerrez and his gang of Mexicans. Rance toasts Minnie, the woman who owns the saloon, as his future wife, which makes Sonora jealous. The two men begin to fight. Rance draws his revolver but at that moment, a shot rings out and Minnie stands next to the bar with a rifle in her hands ("Hello, Minnie!"). She gives the miners a reading lesson from the Bible ("Dove eravamo?").

The Pony Express rider arrives ("La posta!") and delivers a telegram from Nina Micheltorena, offering to reveal Ramerrez's hideout. The sheriff tells Minnie that he loves her, but Minnie puts him off as she is waiting for the right man ("Ti voglio bene, Minnie").

A stranger enters the saloon and asks for a whisky and water. He introduces himself as Dick Johnson from Sacramento, whom Minnie had met earlier. Johnson invites Minnie to dance with him and she accepts. Angrily, Rance watches them.

Ashby returns with the captured Ramerrez gang member, Castro. Upon seeing his leader, Johnson, in the saloon, Castro agrees to lead Rance, Ashby and the miners in a search for Ramerrez, and the group then follows him on a false trail and in what turns out to be a wild goose chase. But before Castro leaves, he whispers to Johnson that somebody will whistle and Johnson must reply to confirm that the place is clear. A whistle is heard, but Johnson fails to reply.

Minnie shows Johnson the keg of gold that she and the miners take turns to guard at night and Johnson reassures her that the gold will be safe there. Before he leaves the saloon, he promises to visit her at her cabin. They confess their love for each other. Minnie begins to cry, and Johnson comforts her before he leaves.

Act 2
Minnie's dwelling, later that evening

Wowkle, a Native American woman who is Minnie's servant, her lover Billy Jackrabbit and their baby are present as Minnie enters, wanting to get ready for Johnson's visit. Johnson enters Minnie's cabin and she tells him all about her life. It begins to snow. They kiss and Minnie asks him to stay till morning. He denies knowing Nina Micheltorena. As Johnson hides, a posse enters looking for Ramerrez and reveal to Minnie that Johnson is the bandit Ramerrez himself. Angry, she orders Johnson to leave. After he leaves, Minnie hears a gunshot and she knows Johnson has been shot. Johnson staggers in and collapses, Minnie helps him by hiding him up in the loft. Rance enters Minnie's cabin looking for the bandit and is about to give up searching for Johnson when drops of blood fall on his hand. Rance forces Johnson to climb down. Minnie desperately makes Rance an offer: if she beats him at poker, he must let Johnson go free; if Rance wins, she will marry him. Hiding some cards in her stockings, Minnie cheats and wins. Rance honors the deal and Minnie throws herself on the unconscious Johnson on the floor.

Act 3
In the Great Californian Forest at dawn, sometime later

Johnson is again on the run from Ashby and the miners. Nick and Rance are discussing Johnson and wonder what Minnie sees in him when Ashby arrives in triumph: Johnson has been captured. Rance and the miners all want Johnson to be hanged. Johnson accepts the sentence and only asks the miners not to tell Minnie about his capture and his fate ("Ch'ella mi creda"). Minnie arrives, armed with a pistol, just before the execution and throws herself in front of Johnson to protect him. While Rance tries to proceed, she convinces the miners that they owe her too much to kill the man she loves, and asks them to forgive him ("Ah! Ah! E Minnie!"). One by one, the miners yield to her plea ("E anche tu lo vorrai, Joe"). Rance is not happy but finally he too gives in. Sonora unties Johnson and sets him free. The miners bid Minnie farewell ("Le tue parole sono di Dio"). Minnie and Johnson leave California to start a new life together.

Instrumentation
La fanciulla del West is scored for piccolo; three flutes; three oboes; one English horn; three clarinets in B-flat; one bass clarinet in B-flat; three bassoons; one contrabassoon; four French horns in F; three trumpets in F; three tenor trombones; one bass trombone; a percussion section with timpani, cymbals, one triangle, one snare drum, one bass drum, and one glockenspiel; three onstage fonicas; one celesta; two harps; and strings.

Recordings

Other influences
The melody for Jake Wallace's song near the beginning of the first act is derived from two songs in a collection of Zuni melodies "recorded and harmonized" by ethnomusicologist Carlos Troyer, published in 1909. Puccini had obtained this publication in an effort to find authentic Native American music for the role of Wowkle, but he ended up using it for Jake Wallace instead. (Several books about Puccini repeat Mosco Carner's claim that the song is based on Stephen Foster's "Old Dog Tray"; it is not.)

A climactic phrase sung by Johnson, "E provai una gioia strana" (alternatively "Ho provato una gioia strana" in some versions of the libretto) from "Quello che tacete" near the end of the first act, is widely cited to resemble a similar phrase in the Phantom's song "The Music of the Night" in Andrew Lloyd Webber's 1986 musical The Phantom of the Opera. The Puccini estate sued Lloyd Webber over copyright infringement and the matter was settled out of court.

The opera was first portrayed in film in 1915 by famed director Cecil B. DeMille, and subsequently by directors Edwin Carewe in 1923, and John Francis Dillon, whose 1930 film was lost. A 1938 film directed by Robert Z. Leonard was based not on the opera but on the original play by Belasco, who wrote the screenplay; Sigmund Romberg wrote songs for this film.

Notes and references
Notes

References

Cited sources
 
 
 
Other sources
 Holden, Amanda (ed.) (2001). The New Penguin Opera Guide. New York: Penguin Putnam 
 Warrack, John and West, Ewan (1992). The Oxford Dictionary of Opera. New York: Oxford University Press

External links

 
 Libretto (Italian, Russian)
 fanciulla100.org, an educational website dedicated to the opera's centenary Retrieved 26 October 2010

 "Puccini and New York", lecture by Professor Roger Parker on the opera, given at Gresham College on 11 June 2007 (with video and audio files available for download).

Operas by Giacomo Puccini
Italian-language operas
Operas
1910 operas
Verismo operas
Opera world premieres at the Metropolitan Opera
Operas based on plays
Operas set in the United States
California Gold Rush in fiction